The Enron Code of Ethics was a 64-page booklet published by Enron Corporation, the last known edition of which was in July 2000.

The sale of copies of the booklet on eBay has passed into internet folklore. 
An article in the San Francisco Chronicle for February 10, 2002 reported a final bid level on one copy of USD 202.50. 
Another sale on eBay (which ran from February 13 to February 20, 2002) carried the item number "1074129276". In the latter sale, the booklet was sold together with a cup, also allegedly an Enron product, which featured text extolling the virtues of the Enron retirement plan.

References

External links
 Review:  (March 2002)
 Special collection: Enron and Ethics - a large selection of web resources related to ethics problems at Enron.

Ethics books
Business ethics
Enron